The Worst Christmas of My Life is a 2012 Italian comedy film directed by Alessandro Genovesi and starring Fabio De Luigi and Cristiana Capotondi. It is the sequel of The Worst Week of My Life.

It was a commercial success, grossing $10,275,097 at the Italian box office.

Plot 
Paolo needs to reach the castle of Alberto Caccia, where he is invited to spend Christmas holidays with his wife Margherita, at the ninth month of pregnancy, and her family. Among various mishaps and blunders, Paolo will come to make everyone believe, because of a misunderstanding, that Alberto is dead because of his fault.

Cast 

Fabio De Luigi as Paolo
Cristiana Capotondi as Margherita
Antonio Catania as Giorgio
Anna Bonaiuto as Clara
 Dino Abbrescia as Pino
Laura Chiatti as Benedetta
Diego Abatantuono as Alberto Caccia
Andrea Mingardi as Dino
 Ale e Franz as The Gravediggers

See also
 List of Christmas films
 List of Italian films of 2012

References

External links

2010s Christmas comedy films
Italian Christmas comedy films
Films directed by Alessandro Genovesi
2012 comedy films
2012 films
2010s Italian films